Hypolimnas pithoeca is a butterfly in the family Nymphalidae. It is found in New Guinea.

Subspecies
Hypolimnas pithoeca pithoeca Kirsch, 1877 (New Guinea)
Hypolimnas pithoeca bradleyi Howarth, 1962 (Rennell Island)
Hypolimnas pithoeca dampierensis Rothschild, 1915 (Dampier Island)
Hypolimnas pithoeca ferruginea Howarth, 1962 (Bellona Island)
Hypolimnas pithoeca fumosus Joicey & Noakes, 1915 (Biak)
Hypolimnas pithoeca gretheri Clark, 1946 (Admiralty Islands)
Hypolimnas pithoeca salomona D'Abrera, 1977 (Gudalcanal)
Hypolimnas pithoeca vulcanica Rothschild, 1915 (Manam Island)

References

pithoeca
Butterflies described in 1877